Fustic is a common name for several plants and a dye produced from these plants:

 A dye made from Maclura tinctoria (old fustic)
 A dye made from Cotinus coggygria (young fustic)